Church of the Guardian Angel is a historic Roman Catholic church at 5614 Demel Street in Wallis, Texas.

It was built in 1913 and added to the National Register of Historic Places in 1983.

See also

National Register of Historic Places listings in Austin County, Texas

References

External links

Church Website

Churches in Austin County, Texas
Roman Catholic churches in Texas
Properties of religious function on the National Register of Historic Places in Texas
Carpenter Gothic church buildings in Texas
Roman Catholic churches completed in 1913
20th-century Roman Catholic church buildings in the United States
1913 establishments in Texas
National Register of Historic Places in Austin County, Texas